The Youngbloods were an American rock band consisting of Jesse Colin Young (vocals, bass, guitar), Jerry Corbitt (vocals, guitar, keyboards, harmonica), Lowell "Banana" Levinger (guitar and electric piano), and Joe Bauer (drums). Despite receiving critical acclaim, they never achieved widespread popularity. Their only U.S. Top 40 entry was Chet Powers' "Get Together". They are often remembered as a one-hit wonder.

Band history

Background and formation
Jesse Colin Young (born Perry Miller, November 22, 1941, Queens, New York City) was a moderately successful folk singer with two LPs under his belt – Soul of a City Boy (1964) and Youngblood (1965) – when he met fellow folk singer and former bluegrass musician from Cambridge, Massachusetts, Jerry Corbitt (born Jerry Byron Corbitt, January 7, 1943, Tifton, Georgia). When in town, Young would drop in on Corbitt, and the two played together exchanging harmonies.

Beginning in January 1965, the two began performing on the Canadian circuit as a duo, eventually adopting the name "The Youngbloods". Young played bass, and Corbitt sang and played piano, harmonica and lead guitar. Corbitt introduced Young to a bluegrass musician, Lowell Levinger (born Lowell Vincent Levinger III, September 9, 1944, Manhattan). Levinger, known as "Banana", could play the piano, banjo, mandolin, mandola, guitar and bass; he had played in the Proper Bostonians and the Trolls, and played mainly piano and guitar in the Youngbloods. He knew of a fellow tenant who could flesh out the band, Joe Bauer (born September 26, 1941, Memphis, Tennessee), an aspiring jazz drummer with experience playing in society dance bands.

Small gigs to recording success
Once the line-up was set, Jesse Colin Young and the Youngbloods, as the group was then known, began building a reputation from their club dates. (Early demo sides from 1965 were later issued by Mercury Records on the Two Trips album.) Their first concert had been at Gerde's Folk City in Greenwich Village; months later, they were the house band at the Cafe Au Go Go and had signed a recording contract with RCA Victor. Young, however, was not satisfied with RCA.

The arrangement produced one charting single, "Grizzly Bear" (number 52 in 1967). Several critically praised albums followed: The Youngbloods (1967, later retitled Get Together); Earth Music (1967); and Elephant Mountain (1969), with the track "Darkness, Darkness".

In 1967, when the track "Get Together", a paean to universal brotherhood, first appeared, it did not sell well, reaching only number 62 on the chart. But two years later – after Dan Ingram had recorded a brotherhood promotion for WABC-AM in which the song was used as a bed for the promotion, and after the National Council of Christians and Jews subsequently used the song in television and radio commercials – the track was re-released and cracked the Top 5. This disc sold over one million copies and received a gold record, awarded by the RIAA, on October 7, 1969.

Johnny Carson once reportedly refused to allow the band to perform on The Tonight Show Starring Johnny Carson, saying they were overly demanding during the pre-show soundcheck. In a 2009 interview, Young stated that the band refused to perform because the show reneged on a promise that they could play a song from their new album Elephant Mountain, instead demanding that they play only "Get Together".

With Corbitt's departure from the band (for a solo career) in 1969, before the band recorded the album Elephant Mountain, Levinger assumed lead guitar duties and played extensively on Wurlitzer electric piano. The band became adept at lengthy improvisations in their live performances (as captured on the albums Rock Festival and Ride the Wind, released after the band moved over to their own Raccoon label, distributed by Warner Brothers).

The group added the bassist Michael Kane to their lineup in 1971 and released two more albums: Good & Dusty (1971), which featured "Hippie from Olema" (an answer to Merle Haggard's "Okie from Muskogee"), and High on a Ridgetop (1972), before disbanding. Young, Levinger and Bauer went on to solo careers; only Young had any notable success. Levinger, Bauer and Kane were part of another group, Noggins, in 1972, which released one album, Crab Tunes. Bauer died of a brain tumor in September 1982, at the age of 40.

Later history
In 1971, Jerry Corbitt and former Youngbloods producer Charlie Daniels formed a band called Corbitt & Daniels and toured.

Banana supplied guitar, banjo, synthesizer, and back-up vocals to Mimi Fariña's 1985 solo album, Solo, and also toured with her on and off from 1973 until the 1990s. During the 1980s and 1990s, he played with the jam rock band Zero on keyboards, vocals and rhythm guitar.

In late 1984, the Youngbloods briefly reunited for a club tour. The 1984 line-up contained Young, Corbitt and Levinger, plus new members David Perper (drums, ex-Pablo Cruise) and Scott Lawrence (keyboards, woodwinds). Once the tour was completed, the group disbanded once again by mid-1985.

Jerry Corbitt died of lung cancer on March 8, 2014. He was 71.

Lowell Levinger released three self-produced bluegrass albums as "Grandpa Banana": I'll Do Anything For You (2009), Just Trying To Break Even (2011) and Even Grandpas Get The Blues (2012).  He later joined Little Steven and the Disciples of Soul for their 2017 European and 2018 American tours in support of (Steven) Van Zandt's latest album, Soulfire.

In 2014, Sony Music Japan remastered the first three Youngbloods albums as The Youngbloods – 3 Albums Collection 1967–1969 (Mini LP BSCD2). The Youngbloods and Earth Music, contain both mono and stereo versions of the album plus bonus tracks.  Elephant Mountain contains the full stereo version of the album, plus a few mono versions of selected tracks plus bonus tracks.

Former members
Jesse Colin Young – bass, guitar, vocals (1965–1972, 1984–1985)
Jerry Corbitt – guitar, harmonica, vocals (1965–1969, 1984–1985; died 2014)
Lowell Levinger – lead guitar, piano, finger cymbals, pedal steel guitar, vocals (1965–1972, 1984–1985)
Joe Bauer – drums (1965–1972; died 1982)
Michael Kane – bass (1971–1972; died 2022)
David Perper – drums (1984–1985)
Scott Lawrence – keyboards, woodwinds (1984–1985)
John Richard (Earthquake) Anderson – group manager, harmonica, vocals (1968–1972; died 2017)

Discography

Studio albums

Compilation albums

Live albums

Reissue albums

Singles

References

External links
VH1 Biography: The Youngbloods

Lowell Levinger Interview NAMM Oral History Library (2017)

American folk rock groups
Psychedelic rock music groups from New York (state)
RCA Records artists